Jiaolong ( flood dragon) is a Chinese crewed deep-sea research submersible that can dive to a depth of over . It has the second-greatest depth range of any crewed research vehicle of the Chinese Navy; the only crewed expeditions to have gone deeper were the dives of the Trieste bathyscaphe in 1960, Archimède in 1962, Deepsea Challenger in 2012, and DSV Limiting Factor in 2019 (with three diving to Challenger Deep).

The general designer is Xu Qinan (徐芑南), a former professor at the School of Naval Architecture, Ocean and Civil Engineering (船舶与海洋工程学院) of Shanghai Jiao Tong University (SJTU), who also designed many other Chinese submersibles and uncrewed underwater vehicles. Xu is now an academician for the Chinese Academy of Engineering. The first deputy general designer is Cui Weicheng (崔维成), and the deputy general designer was Zhu Weiqing (朱维庆).

On June 27, 2012, the Jiaolong with two oceanauts reached a depth of 7,062 meters (23,169 feet) in the Mariana Trench in the western Pacific Ocean. Previously, on June 19, 2012, the Jiaolong reached a depth of 6,965 metres (22,851 feet). The five-hour mission included chemical, physical and biological research. Seventeen dives have been completed.

Besides China, other countries that have developed deep-water technology include the United States, France, Russia and Japan.

See also

References

Submarines of the People's Republic of China
Deep-submergence vehicles
Research submarines of China